Chisom Chikatara (born 24 November 1994) is a Nigerian professional footballer who plays as a forward. He is known for his speed on the ball, dribbles and goal scoring abilities.

Club career

Early career
Chikatara joined the local football club Independent FC, a club for children of age 13 below. After five years with the club, he outgrew it and moved over to New Generation FC. While playing for this club he sign a short loan deal with Benie Aries FC in a Super Four Competition between Abia Warriors Fc, Heartland FC and Diamond FC. He was the highest goal scorer in the competition. He had various offers to move to Heartland FC then which was already in the Glo Premier League but finally he moved to Abia Warriors at the age of seventeen. He signed the contract in November 2012.

Abia Warriors FC
Chikatara was part of the pillar that brought the team into the 1st division league especially with his goal scoring technique. the Super "S" as he is called by fans always scores which made him to be named the highest goal scorer as the club was promoted. On 18 September 2015, his mother died and he was not told about it because the club had a home big clash against Warri Wolves, they won the match 2–1 before the Club Chairman High Chief Emeka Inyama Broke the news to him.

Later career
After leaving Egypt, Chikatara returned to Nigeria and began training with Akwa United in October 2019. No deal was signed with Akwa United and on 12 December 2019, Jordanian club Al-Faisaly announced that they had signed Chikatara on a 2-year contract. However, Chikatara later confirmed in an interview, that there had been negotiations and that the parties reached an agreement, but the deal was not concluded and it was deported quickly.

In the beginning of 2020, Chikatara then joined Bahraini club Al-Shabab Club. Later in 2020, Chikatara joined Iraqi club Naft Maysan.

Gokulam Kerala
On 3 September 2021, Chikatara signed with I-League champions Gokulam Kerala for a season.

International career
Chikatara was a part of the Nigeria national team that played at the 2016 African Nations Championship. In Nigeria's first group stage match versus Niger, he was substituted on in the 58th minute and bagged a hat-trick. The match ended in a 4–1 win. He was awarded "Man of the Match". In the second group stage match against Tunisia he also came from the bench to put his name on the scoreboard before Tunisia's Ahmed Akaïchi equalised. Chikatara made a third substitute appearances in the third group stage match, a 1–0 defeat to Guinea, while Nigeria failed to proceed to the next round of the competition.

Style of play
A quick, and agile right-footed striker, Chisom is primarily known for his outstanding pace, mobility, and athleticism as a footballer, as well as his striking power, and his strength, despite his young age;

Career statistics

Club

International

Scores and results list Nigeria's goal tally first, score column indicates score after each Chikatara goal.

Honours

References

External links

1994 births
Living people
People from Abia State
Nigerian footballers
Nigeria youth international footballers
Nigeria international footballers
Nigerian expatriate footballers
Association football forwards
Government College Umuahia alumni
Wydad AC players
El Gouna FC players
Tala'ea El Gaish SC players
Abia Warriors F.C. players
Naft Maysan FC players
Botola players
Egyptian Premier League players
Nigeria Professional Football League players
Iraqi Premier League players
Nigerian expatriate sportspeople in Morocco
Nigerian expatriate sportspeople in Egypt
Nigerian expatriate sportspeople in Bahrain
Nigerian expatriate sportspeople in Iraq
Expatriate footballers in Iraq
Expatriate footballers in Morocco
Expatriate footballers in Bahrain
Gokulam Kerala FC players
Expatriate footballers in India
I-League players
Nigeria A' international footballers
2016 African Nations Championship players
Nigerian expatriate sportspeople in India